DYRF (99.5 FM), broadcasting as 99.5 Star FM, is a radio station owned and operated by Bombo Radyo Philippines through its licensee People's Broadcasting Service, Inc. It serves as the flagship station of the Star FM Network. Its studio, offices and transmitter are located at the 3rd Floor, R. Florete Bldg., Rizal St. cor. Iznart St., Iloilo City.

History
DYRF was Bombo Radyo's first FM station, established in 1976 as 99.5 RF. In 1987, it began carrying a Top 40 format with the slogan "The Rhythm of the City". On April 22, 1994, to provide a more solid identity for all of Bombo Radyo's FM stations, the station was re-launched as 99.5 Star FM and switched to a mass-based format. On February 3, 2014, Bombo Network News began simulcasting in several Star FM stations. In the 1st quarter of 2016, to emphasize more on the music, Star FM started carrying the slogan "It's All For You".

References

Radio stations in Iloilo City
Radio stations established in 1976
Bombo Radyo Philippines